William Duncombe was one of the two MPs for Bury St Edmunds between 1673 and 1679 and also for Bedfordshire in 1689 and 1695.

References

Duncombe